William Duncan Bradley (January 13, 1913 – March 28, 1992) was an American politician and member of the Democratic Party.

A native of Fife, Texas, Bradley sat on the Oklahoma House of Representatives from 1952 to 1982. Upon leaving the state legislature, Bradley served as city manager of Waurika on a volunteer basis. He died on March 28, 1992, aged 79.

References

People from McCulloch County, Texas
1913 births
1992 deaths
Democratic Party members of the Oklahoma House of Representatives
20th-century Members of the Oklahoma House of Representatives
American city managers

20th-century American politicians